The Weight of the World is the 2004 release from Australian three-piece band The Beautiful Girls.
This 4 track CD was released with some remixes and unreleased songs.

Track listing
Weight Of The World
Blackbird (Kuya's 6x4 Remix)
Summer Time
I Need To Give This Broken Heart Away

Album Personnel
Mat McHugh - vocals and guitar. Mitch Connelly - drums and percussion. Clay MacDonald - bass and vocals.

The Beautiful Girls albums
2004 EPs